Central Jail (Kendriya Karagar) is the largest prison facility of Nepal. It is located near Newroad of central Kathmandu. The jail is also called Bhadragol jail (भद्रगोल कारागार).To the east of the jail lies office of the drinking water corporation, Bhotebahal in the west, office of Kathmandu metropolitan in the north. This jail occupies an area of 42 ropanies (about 2.2 hectare). Inside the compound lies Bhadra Jail, Women Jail and Central Jail. There are nine blocks in the central jail, three blocks in Bhadra jail and three in the women jail. In , a hospital was also set up inside the jail for inmates. There is a small textile factory with 74 machines inside the jail.

The jail which has capacity for 1250 inmates but it hosts 2,750 prisoners including 350 foreign prisoners. There are plans to expand the jail by shifting to Nuwakot.

Notable inmates
Durgananda Jha, following an attempt to bomb King Mahendra in 1964. He was executed inside the jail later.
Charles Sobhraj, for murder of multiple people. He was listed to be free due to COVID-19 vulnerability, but the decision has not been executed.
Ram Prasad Rai, political prisoner.
Chudamani Upreti aka Gore, mastermind of the biggest gold smuggling racket in Nepal.
Yunus Ansari, an associate of Dawood Ibrahim was shot in the jail. He was serving for carrying fake Indian currency.
Tsongkha Lhamo Tsering - Tibetan freedom fighter,  imprisoned with eight other Tibetans around 1974 after ending their resistance operations in Mustang, Nepal.

See also
List of prisons in Nepal

References

Prisons in Nepal
Buildings and structures in Kathmandu